Ballinascarthy railway station was on the Clonakilty Extension Railway in County Cork, Ireland.

History
The station opened on 1 November 1886.

Regular passenger services were withdrawn on 1 April 1961.

References

Further reading 
 

Disused railway stations in County Cork
Railway stations opened in 1886
Railway stations closed in 1961
1886 establishments in Ireland
Railway stations in the Republic of Ireland opened in the 19th century